Linda Dillon (Irish: Líonda Diolún; born 5 August 1978) is an Irish Sinn Féin politician from Northern Ireland. She has been an MLA for Mid Ulster since 2016.

Originally elected as a Mid-Ulster councillor for the Torrent DEA (topping the poll with 14.8% of the total valid votes), she served as the inaugural chairperson of Mid-Ulster District Council since its inception in April 2015 and also sat on the Council's Development Committee until being elected to Stormont in May 2016.

As Martin McGuinness elected to run in the Foyle constituency in the 2016 Assembly election, Linda was then selected to replace him as a candidate in the Mid-Ulster constituency. She was elected with her two other party colleagues (Ian Milne and Michelle O'Neill) on the first count, amassing 5,833 votes (14.3%).

References

1978 births
Living people
Sinn Féin MLAs
Northern Ireland MLAs 2016–2017
Northern Ireland MLAs 2017–2022
Members of Mid Ulster District Council
Female members of the Northern Ireland Assembly
Women councillors in Northern Ireland
Northern Ireland MLAs 2022–2027